Albert Hoffman may refer to:
Albert Hoffman (artist) (1915–1993), American artist
Albert Hoffmann (Nazi) (1907–1972), German politician and Nazi Gauleiter
Albert Hoffmann (horticulturist) (1846–1924), German rosarian
Albert Hofmann (1906–2008), Swiss scientist and discoverer of LSD-25

See also
Al Hoffman (1902–1960), songwriter
Al Hofmann (1947–2008), drag car owner
Abbie Hoffman (1936–1989), American activist
Abby Hoffman (born 1947), Canadian track and field athlete